Nathaniel Bradstreet Shurtleff, Sr. (June 22, 1810 – October 17, 1874) was an American politician, serving as the twentieth mayor of Boston, Massachusetts from January 6, 1868 to January 2, 1871.

Shurtleff, who had been defeated as the Know Nothing candidate for mayor in 1855 and as a Democrat in 1865 and 1866, was elected in 1867 as a Democrat.

Honors
Shurtleff was elected a member of the American Antiquarian Society in 1849.  He was chosen to serve on the society's board of councilors from 1853 to 1874. In 1857, he was elected to the American Philosophical Society.

Books

Shurtleff is well known to genealogists and historians as the editor of the Massachusetts Bay Colony records (published in five volumes from 1853 as Records of the Governor and Company of the Massachusetts Bay in New England) and of part of the Plymouth Colony records.
A Topographical and Historical Description of Boston.

See also
 Timeline of Boston, 1860s-1870s

References

Bibliography

 A Catalogue of the City Councils of Boston, 1822–1908, Roxbury, 1846–1867, Charlestown 1847-1873 and of The Selectmen of Boston, 1634-1822 also of Various Other Town and Municipal officers, Boston, MA: City of Boston Printing Department,  (1909) pp. 258–261.
 Mayors of Boston: An Illustrated Epitome of who the Mayors Have Been and What they Have Done, Boston, MA: State Street Trust Company, (1914) pp. 28–29.

External links
 
 Open Library. Works by Nathaniel Bradstreet Shurtleff

1810 births
1874 deaths
Harvard Medical School alumni
Physicians from Massachusetts
Mayors of Boston
Harvard University alumni
Members of the American Antiquarian Society
19th-century American politicians
Trustees of the Boston Public Library